Hong Kong Nights is a 1935 American thriller film directed by E. Mason Hopper and starring Tom Keene, Wera Engels and Warren Hymer. An American customs agent tracks gunrunners operating out of Hong Kong.

Cast
 Tom Keene as Tom Keene  
 Wera Engels as Trina Vidor  
 Warren Hymer as Wally  
 Tetsu Komai as  Wong  
 Cornelius Keefe as Gil Burris  
 Tom London as Blake  
 Freeman Lang as Capt. Evans  
 Allan Cavan as Mr. Caulder

References

Bibliography
 Pitts, Michael R. Poverty Row Studios, 1929–1940: An Illustrated History of 55 Independent Film Companies, with a Filmography for Each. McFarland & Company, 2005.

External links
 

1935 films
1930s thriller films
American thriller films
Films directed by E. Mason Hopper
Films set in Hong Kong
American black-and-white films
1930s English-language films
1930s American films